Małgorzata Kozaczuk  (born 6 June 1988) is a Polish sabre fencer.

Life

Kozaczuk was born in Warsaw in 1988. She represented her country at the 2016 Summer Olympics. She was also scheduled to complete in the sabre fencing team with Marta Puda, Alexsandra Socha and Bogna Jóźwiak.

References 

1988 births
Living people
Polish female sabre fencers
Fencers at the 2016 Summer Olympics
Olympic fencers of Poland
Fencers from Warsaw
20th-century Polish women
21st-century Polish women